Matthew George Greene (born May 13, 1983) is an American former professional ice hockey defenceman. Originally drafted in the second round, 44th overall, at the 2002 NHL Entry Draft by the Edmonton Oilers, he most notably served as an alternate captain for the Los Angeles Kings, with whom he won the Stanley Cup twice. Greene worked in the Kings' organization as a professional scout after retiring from playing.

Playing career
As a youth, Greene played in the 1997 Quebec International Pee-Wee Hockey Tournament with a minor ice hockey team from Kalamazoo, Michigan.

Edmonton Oilers
Greene was drafted in the second round, 44th overall, by the Edmonton Oilers in the 2002 NHL Entry Draft. Prior to his professional career, he played for three seasons with the North Dakota Fighting Sioux  men's ice hockey team. In 2004–05, Greene captained The Fighting Sioux to the NCAA Men's Ice Hockey Championship game, losing to the University of Denver Pioneers, 4–1.

Due to his talent, Greene was encouraged to leave college hockey after only three seasons to start a professional career. After a successful training camp with the Oilers prior to the 2005–06 season, Greene signed a professional contract with Edmonton and was assigned to their American Hockey League (AHL) affiliate in Des Moines, the Iowa Stars. He made his NHL debut with the Oilers on December 30, 2005, against the Nashville Predators, and scored his first NHL point on January 25, 2006, away against he Mighty Ducks of Anaheim, assisting on an Aleš Hemský goal.

Wearing sweater number 32 for the first 13 games of his NHL career, Greene changed to sweater number 2 on February 2, 2006, when the Oilers faced off against the Columbus Blue Jackets.

Greene was part of the Edmonton team that made a run to the Stanley Cup Finals, though the Cinderalla run eventually fell short after the Oilers lost in Game 7 to the Carolina Hurricanes. Greene contributed an assist in his team's playoff run.

Greene scored his first NHL goal on December 15, 2006, against Minnesota Wild netminder Manny Fernandez. The goal was scored in the third period of the game, evening the score at 1–1. The Oilers would eventually score two more goals, winning 3–1. Local Edmonton broadcaster Gene Principe awarded Greene the game puck during an interview session following the game. Greene also received the second star of the game due to his effort.

Los Angeles Kings
 
Greene and his Oiler teammate Jarret Stoll were traded to the Los Angeles Kings on June 29, 2008, in exchange for Kings defenseman Ľubomír Višňovský. On October 8, 2008, he was named as an alternate captain of the Kings. Nine days later, on October 17, he signed a five-year contract extension with the Kings.
In the 2012 Stanley Cup playoffs, Greene and the Kings won the Stanley Cup by beating the New Jersey Devils in six games. He scored the final goal of the 2012 Stanley Cup Finals in the Kings' 6–1 Game 6 triumph.

Injuries limited Greene to only five games during the 2012–13 season, a campaign that saw the Kings fail to defend their Stanley Cup title, losing to the eventual champion Chicago Blackhawks in five games in the Western Conference Finals.

On June 13, 2014, Greene and his Kings teammates defeated the New York Rangers in Game 5 of the 2014 Stanley Cup Finals 3–2 in double overtime, securing his and the team's second Stanley Cup in three years. He was then resigned to a 4-year, $10 million contract.

On June 30, 2016, Greene was placed on unconditional waivers by the Kings for the purpose of buying out the final two years of his contract, following a season where the defenseman played only three games due to a shoulder injury, picking up no points and eight penalty minutes. He was however not bought out from his contract and remained with the team for the duration of the 2016–17 season.

Again limited to injury and back surgery, Greene featured in just 26 games for a goal and assist. As a consequence, he was stripped of his alternate captaincy due to the length of time he missed last season. In the following off-season he was activated from the injured reserve to be bought out from the remaining year of his contract on June 13, 2017.

On August 14, 2017, Greene joined the Kings as a pro scout, ending his playing career.

Career statistics

Regular season and playoffs

International

Awards and honors

References

External links

 

1983 births
American men's ice hockey defensemen
Edmonton Oilers draft picks
Edmonton Oilers players
Green Bay Gamblers players
Ice hockey players from Michigan
Iowa Stars players
Living people
Los Angeles Kings players
Los Angeles Kings scouts
North Dakota Fighting Hawks men's ice hockey players
People from Grand Ledge, Michigan
Springfield Falcons players
Stanley Cup champions